HMS Collingwood was an 80-gun two-deck second rate ship of the line of the Royal Navy, launched on 17 August 1841 at Pembroke Dockyard.

It was fitted with screw propulsion in 1861, and sold out of the navy in 1867.

One of its first crew was Midshipman (later Commodore) James Graham Goodenough, whilst the ship was in the Pacific fleet of Admiral Sir George Francis Seymour.

Notes

References

Lavery, Brian (2003) The Ship of the Line - Volume 1: The development of the battlefleet 1650–1850. Conway Maritime Press. .
Kay, H Alison (1986) HMS Collingwood 1844-1848 (Pacific Station), From the Journals of Philip Horatio Townsend Somerville,R.N. The Pentland Press 

Ships of the line of the Royal Navy
Vanguard-class ships of the line
Ships built in Pembroke Dock
1841 ships
Victorian-era ships of the line of the United Kingdom